Steve Brodie (born John Daugherty Stephens; November 21, 1919 – January 9, 1992) was an American stage, film, and television actor from El Dorado in Butler County in south central Kansas. He reportedly adopted his screen name in memory of Steve Brodie, a daredevil who claimed to have jumped from the Brooklyn Bridge in 1886 and survived.

Career
Brodie appeared in 79 feature films during his career (1944-1988), plus a profusion of appearances on episodic TV. He worked at various studios, including MGM, RKO and Republic Pictures, appearing mostly in westerns and B-movies. He played supporting roles in the majority of his films, including the 1947 film noir classic Out of the Past and 1950's Armored Car Robbery.

An exception was 1947's Desperate, where he had a starring role. Later appearances included roles in two Elvis Presley films: 1961's Blue Hawaii and 1964's Roustabout.

Beginning in the mid 1950s, he appeared mostly on television, with guest-starring roles in such series as Stories of the Century (as the outlaw Harry Tracy), Crossroads, Sugarfoot, Colt .45, Cheyenne (TV Series), Stagecoach West, Richard Diamond, Private Detective, The Public Defender, Alfred Hitchcock Presents, The Alaskans, Pony Express,  The Brothers Brannagan, Going My Way, The Asphalt Jungle, Wanted: Dead or Alive, and The Dakotas. Brodie made three guest appearances on Perry Mason.He portrayed murderer Ben Wallace in the 1959 episode 'The Case of the Garrulous Gambler', Eddie Lewis in the 1962 episode 'The Case of the Angry Astronaut' and Quinn Torrey in the 1964 episode 'The Case of the Witless Witness'.

Brodie and Lash La Rue appeared nine and five times, respectively, as Sheriff Johnny Behan of Cochise County, Arizona, an historical person, in the ABC western series, The Life and Legend of Wyatt Earp, starring Hugh O'Brian as Wyatt Earp.<

Brodie appeared on stage in the 1950s as Maryk in a national company production of The Caine Mutiny Court-Martial, co-starring with Paul Douglas as Queeg and Wendell Corey as Greenwald.

Personal life
Brodie was married to actress Lois Andrews from 1946 to 1948. He married Barbara Ann Savitt in 1950.Their son, Kevin Brodie, was a child actor who later became a film producer, director, and screenwriter.

Death
Steve Brodie in 1992, at age 72, died of cancer in Canoga Park, California. In his obituary in The Los Angeles Times, the newspaper erroneously states that Brodie had been nominated for an Academy Award as Best Supporting Actor for 1949's Home of the Brave. Actually, the actor was not among the five nominees in that category that year.

Partial filmography

1940s
Ladies Courageous (1944) as Tower Man (uncredited)
Follow the Boys (1944) as Australian Pilot (uncredited)
Thirty Seconds Over Tokyo (1944) as MP Corporal (uncredited)
This Man's Navy (1945) as Timothy Joseph Aloysius 'Tim' Shannon
The Clock (1945) as Sergeant (uncredited)
It's in the Bag! (1945) as Usher (uncredited)
Anchors Aweigh (1945) as Soldier (uncredited)
The Crimson Canary (1945) as Hillary
A Walk in the Sun (1945) as Pvt. Judson
Young Widow (1946) as Willie Murphy
Badman's Territory (1946) as Bob Dalton
Sunset Pass (1946) as Cashier Slagle
Criminal Court (1946) as Frankie Wright - Vic's Brother
The Falcon's Adventure (1946) as Benny
Trail Street (1947) as Logan Maury
Code of the West (1947) as Henchman Matt Saunders
Thunder Mountain (1947) as Chick Jorth
Desperate (1947) as Steve Randall
Crossfire (1947) as Floyd
Out of the Past (1947) as Fisher
The Arizona Ranger (1948) as Quirt Butler
Guns of Hate (1948) as Anse Morgan
Return of the Bad Men (1948) as Cole Younger
Station West (1948) as Stellman
Bodyguard (1948) as Fenton
Rose of the Yukon (1949) as Maj. Geoffrey Barnett
Brothers in the Saddle (1949) as Steve Taylor
Rustlers (1949) as Mort Wheeler
I Cheated the Law (1949) as Frank Bricolle
Home of the Brave (1949) as T.J. Everett
Massacre River (1949) as Burke Kimber
Treasure of Monte Cristo (1949) as Earl Jackson
The Big Wheel (1949) as Happy Lee
Tough Assignment (1949) as Boss Morgan

1950s
The Great Plane Robbery (1950) as Murray
Winchester '73 (1950) as Wesley
Armored Car Robbery (1950) as Al Mapes
It's a Small World (1950) as Charlie
The Admiral Was a Lady (1950) as Mike O'Halloran - Boxer
Kiss Tomorrow Goodbye (1950) as Joe 'Jinx' Raynor
The Steel Helmet (1951) as Lt. Driscoll
M (1951) as Police Lt. Becker
The Sword of Monte Cristo (1951) as Sergeant
Only the Valiant (1951) as Trooper Onstot
Fighting Coast Guard (1951) as 'Red' Toon
Two-Dollar Bettor (1951) as Rick Bowers - aka Rick Slate
Joe Palooka in Triple Cross (1951) as Dutch
Bal Tabarin (1952) as Joe Goheen
Three for Bedroom "C" (1952) as Conde Marlowe
Lady in the Iron Mask (1952) as Athos
The Story of Will Rogers (1952) as Dave Marshall
Army Bound (1952) as Matt Hall
White Lightning (1953) as Jack Monohan
The Beast from 20,000 Fathoms (1953) as Sgt. Loomis
The Charge at Feather River (1953) as Pvt. Ryan
Donovan's Brain (1953) as Herbie Yocum
Sea of Lost Ships (1953) as Lt. Rogers
The Caine Mutiny (1954) as Chief Budge
The Far Country (1954) as Ives
The Cruel Tower (1956) as Casey
Gun Duel in Durango (1957) as Dunsten
Under Fire (1957) as Capt. Linn
The Crooked Circle (1957) as Ken Cooper
Spy in the Sky! (1958) as Vic Cabot
Sierra Baron (1958) as Rufus Bynum
Wanted: Dead or Alive (1958) Episode: "Miracle at Pot Hole" as Chester Miller aka Penfold Crane
Wanted: Dead or Alive (1959) Episode: "Call Your Shot" as Jed Miller
Arson for Hire (1959) as Arson Squad Insp. John 'Johnny' Broderick
Here Come the Jets (1959) as Logan

1960s
Three Came to Kill (1960) as Dave Harris
Blue Hawaii (1961) as Tucker Garvey
Cheyenne (TV Series) (1961) Episode: "Winchester Quarantine" as Steve Maclay 
A Girl Named Tamiko (1962) as James Hatten
Cheyenne (TV Series) (1962) Episode: "Man Alone" as Buck Brown 
The Virginian (1963 episode "Run Away Home") as Sheriff Martin
Of Love and Desire (1963) as Bill Maxton
A Bullet for Billy the Kid (1963)
Roustabout (1964) as Fred
The Wild World of Batwoman (1966) as Jim Flanagan
The Cycle Savages (1969) as Police Detective (uncredited)

1970s
The Giant Spider Invasion (1975) as Dr. Vance

Gunsmoke (TV Series)
Garth Brantley / Welch
- No Tomorrow (1972) ... Garth Brantley
- Old Yellow Boots (1961) ... Welch

1980s
Frankenstein Island (1981) as Jocko
Delta Pi (1984) as Jack Enoff
The Wizard of Speed and Time (1989) as Lucky Straeker (final film role)

References

External links

Steve Brodie, Obituary, at Los Angeles Times

1919 births
1992 deaths
People from El Dorado, Kansas
Male actors from Kansas
American male film actors
American male television actors
Deaths from cancer in California
20th-century American male actors
Western (genre) television actors